FC Rustavi (Georgian: საფეხბურთო კლუბი რუსთავი) is a Georgian football club based in the city of Rustavi. Following the 2022 season, they were relegated to Liga 3, the 3rd tier of the national football system.

Founded in 2015, it is one of the youngest participants of the Georgian football leagues.

The team has spent two seasons in the first division.

History
FC Rustavi has no legal connections with any of the football clubs previously existing in the city (Gorda, Metalurgi, Olimpi). As a new team, it was established on 3 July 2015.

League performance

Rustavi debuted in the second division the same year and achieved a modest goal of retaining a place in it by finishing in midtable.

Contrary to expectations, in 2016 they emerged among the favourites, managed to prevail in the promotion contest and under manager Varlam Kilasonia won the league. However, due to the season being transitional to the spring-autumn system, no team was promoted.

Despite a poor start in 2017, the club drastically improved and after a ten-match winning run claimed the first place with automatic promotion to the first tier.

Rustavi signed some experienced players such as Nukri Revishvili, Mamuka Kobakhidze and Otar Martsvaladze and in the very first game in Erovnuli Liga obtained three points at Dinamo Tbilisi. But frequent changes of the squad throughout the season did not contribute to stable results and finally the team finished in the 7th place.

For most of the regular season in 2019 the club was struggling. Eventually, Rustavi could remain in the league in case of play-off victory over Telavi, but they were defeated in both games.

Back in Liga 2 the next season Rustavi joined the promotion battle and remained in a play-off range until the last game. However, the results of the final matchday turned out unfavourable. Yet, in this season Rustavi recorded their biggest win 10–0.

Starting from 2021, the club took part in relegation battles. Initially, Rustavi prevailed over Kolkheti 1913 due to away goals, but in the next season they lost both matches to Kolkheti Khobi, which resulted in their relegation to the third division.

Georgian Cup
Rustavi have twice reached the quarterfinal stage of this competition.

As a lower league side, they came close to the sensation during the game against Dinamo Tbilisi in 2017. After a goalless draw in regular and extra times the winner was determined on penalties.

The same scenario unfolded two years later when Rustavi's Cup campaign was stopped by Torpedo Kutaisi.

Seasons

Squad
As of 28 August 2022

Managers

 Giorgi Mishvelidze (September 2015 – April 2016)
 Varlam Kilasonia (April 2016 – December 2017)
 Vladimir Gazzayev (January – June 2018)
 Varlam Kilasonia (June – September 2018)
 Ucha Sosiashvili (September – December 2018)
 Badri Kvaratskhelia (February – April 2019)
 Varlam Kilasonia (May 2019 – July 2020)
 Suliko Davitashvili (July – August 2020)
 Temur Makharadze (August 2020 – February 2021)
 Vladimer Khachidze (February – July 2021)
 Armaz Jeladze (August 2021 – April 2022)
 Levan Jokhadze (May – November 2022)
 Valeri Abramidze (November — December 2022)
 Varlam Kilasonia (Since February 2023)

Club Staff

Honours
Pirveli Liga/Erovnuli Liga 2

• Winners: 2016 (Group White), 2017

Notable players
Giorgi Mamardashvili

Khvicha Kvaratskhelia

Other teams
Rustavi also have a reserve team, which in the 2022 season participated in Group B of Regionuli Liga. Their home ground is Poladi stadium.

References

External links 

 Profile on Soccerway
 Facebook page

Football clubs in Georgia (country)
Association football clubs established in 2015
2015 establishments in Georgia (country)